Aletejah TV (Arabic; قناة الاتجاه الفضائية) is an Iraqi television channel. The Arabic language network is owned and operated by Kata'ib Hezbollah, an Iraqi militia designated a Foreign Terrorist Organization by the Obama Administration in 2009. Aletejah TV has 500 employees, with offices located in Baghdad and Beirut.

References

External links 
 Aletejah TV website
 Aletejah TV English satellite coordinates
 Official Facebook Page

Television stations in Iraq
Arab mass media
Arabic-language television stations
International broadcasters
Television channels and stations established in 2012
Popular Mobilization Forces